Harre or Harré is a surname. Notable people with the surname include:

 Horace Romano Harré  (1927–2019), British philosopher and psychologist
 Alan Harre (born 1940), the seventeenth president of Valparaiso University
 Laila Harré (born 1966), New Zealand politician
 Ruth Harre, German rower